is a national highway located entirely within Chiba Prefecture, Japan. It connects the cities of Tateyama and Kisarazu, spanning the Bōsō Peninsula in a south–north routing.

Route description
National Route 410 connects the cities of Tateyama and Kisarazu, spanning Chiba Prefecture's Bōsō Peninsula in a south–north routing. Its southern terminus lies at a junction with National Route 127 and National Route 128 in central Tateyama. It travels south from there towards the southern tip of the Bōsō Peninsula, Cape Nojima. Upon reaching the cape, the highway begins curving to the north heading through Minamibōsō and the former town of Chikura. It has another junction with National Route 128 in the former town of Maruyama, sharing a brief concurrency with the route before continuing north into the city of Kamogawa.

History

The tunnel is the second oldest tunnel that is designated as a part of a national highway in Japan.

National Route 410 was established by the Cabinet of Japan in 1982. Construction began on the Kururi–Makuta Bypass of the narrow sections of the highway including the Yomachisaku Daiichi Tunnel in 1989. The  bypass was scheduled to be completed by 2015, but as of 2021, the bypass has yet to be completed. On 23 December 2015, a  section of the Yomachisaku Daiichi Tunnel's shotcrete lining collapsed following a re-application of the supportive lining a month prior to the collapse. The tunnel lining was repaired by the following day.

Major intersections
The route lies entirely within Chiba Prefecture.

See also

References

External links

410
Roads in Chiba Prefecture